Patos Island is a small island in the San Juan Islands of the U.S. state of Washington. Since 1893, it has been home to the Patos Island Lighthouse, guiding vessels through Boundary Pass between Canada and the United States. The name comes from the Spanish pato, meaning "duck," which was given to the island in 1792 by Commander Dionisio Alcalá Galiano of the Sutil and Captain Cayetano Valdés y Flores of the Mexicana.

The Washington State Parks and Recreation Commission began operating Patos Island as a state park under a lease agreement with the Bureau of Land Management in 1974. The entire island is owned by the federal government and is administered by the Bureau of Land Management's Wenatchee Office. The Washington State Parks and Recreation Commission operates a small campground facility at Active Cove near the west side of the island, maintains a  loop trail, and has two offshore mooring buoys.

The entire island, including the lighthouse, is part of the San Juan Islands National Monument, created in 2013.

See also
The Light on the Island

References

External links
Patos Island Marine State Park Washington State Parks and Recreation Commission 
Patos Island State Park Map Washington State Parks and Recreation Commission 
Patos Islands Bureau of Land Management

San Juan Islands
State parks of Washington (state)
Islands of Washington (state)
Bureau of Land Management areas in Washington (state)
Parks in San Juan County, Washington
Pre-statehood history of Washington (state)
Spanish history in the Pacific Northwest
Protected areas established in 1974
1974 establishments in Washington (state)
Uninhabited islands of Washington (state)